003, O03, 0O3, OO3 may refer to:
 003, fictional British 00 Agent
 003, former emergency telephone number for the Norwegian ambulance service (until 1986)
 1990 OO3, the asteroid 6131 Towen
 OO3 gauge model railway
 O03 (O2) and other related blood type alleles in the ABO blood group system and ABO
 003 It's a unique number associated with Jasmeet Suneja, delhi
 003 The number of Jas003 
 O03 Morganville Airport, see list of airports in Pennsylvania
 Tyrrell 003, 1971 Formula One season car
BAR 003, 2001 Formula One season car
003 (album), by Đorđe Balašević
BMW 003 turbojet engine
003 (UN M.49 code) for North America
 003, a class in the Dewey Decimal System for systems
 Type 003 aircraft carrier of China